Manaf may refer to:

Manaf (deity), a pre-Islamic Arabian deity

Ancient Arab names based on the phrase Abd Manaf (lit. slave of Manaf):

Abd Manaf ibn Qusai, great-great-grandfather of the Islamic prophet Muhammad
Hashim ibn Abd Manaf great-grandfather of the Islamic prophet Muhammad
Muttalib ibn Abd Manaf, one of the ancestors of the Sahaba (Muhammad's companions)

A modern male given name:

Manaf Abushgeer (born 1980), Saudi Arabian football player
Manaf Abd al-Rahim al-Rawi (died 2013), Iraqi jihadist
Manaf Suleymanov (1912–2001), Azerbaijani writer
Manaf Tlass (born 1964), Syrian general

See also
Munaf (disambiguation)
Munif